The EuroBasket Division B was the second-ranked tier of the bi-annual EuroBasket competition. In this Division the teams played-off in order to get a promotion into Division A. Conversely, the two worst performing teams of Division A were relegated into Division B. Also, the winner of the Division C tournament would be invited to promote to Division B.

EuroBasket Division B was played until 2011, when FIBA Europe decided to abolish the divisional system.

Tournaments